Marion Kavanaugh Wachtel (June 10, 1873/77 – May 22, 1954) was an American plein air painter in watercolors and oils. She lived and worked with her artist husband Elmer Wachtel in the Arroyo Seco near Pasadena, California, in the early 20th century.

Early life
Marion Kavanagh was born in Milwaukee, Wisconsin to James Kavanagh
and Jean Jo Auston Kavanagh. Her English mother and Irish grandfather were also painters.

Career

She trained at the Art Institute of Chicago, and under William Merritt Chase in New York. She was a member of the New York Watercolor Club. Later, she taught in public schools and at the Art Institute of Chicago. In 1903 she journeyed to California, where she studied under William Keith, and Elmer Wachtel, whom she married in 1904.

She painted primarily figures and portraits in the east and then changed to landscapes of the dramatic Californian and Southwestern terrain. Her medium of choice was watercolor, but she began painting in oils after her husband’s death.

Wachtel was an involved in a number of arts organizations in the Southern California area, including the California Watercolor Society, Pasadena Society of Artists, the Academy of Western Painters, and the California Art Club.She was also a member of the New York Watercolor Club, in New York City.

Posthumous exhibitions
In 2010 an exhibition of Wachtel's work and that of two other turn-of-the-century artists, Annie Harmon and Mary DeNeale Morgan was held at the Saint Mary's College Museum of Art. There were nearly 100 landscape paintings of California in the show made by the en plein air artists.

Collections
Among the collections that hold her works are:
 California State Building, Sacramento, California
 Cedar Rapids Museum, Iowa
 Friday Morning Club, Los Angeles, California
 Women's Club, Hollywood, California

Works
Some of the works by Wachtel are:
 California Mountains, oil
 Coast Mountains of California, before 1907, oil
 Cypress Point, ca. 1900-1910, oil
 Elmer Wachtel, ca. 1912, watercolor
 High Sierras, oil, Laguna Art Museum, California
 Hillside Path in Early Piedmont, ca. 1900, watercolor
 Indian Girl, oil
 Landscape, ca. 1918, watercolor, Laguna Art Museum, California
 Near Santa Barbara, before 1907, oil
 Oaks, ca. 1900-1910, watercolor
 Sycamores, watercolor, Laguna Art Museum, California
 Teton Park,'' oil

Notes

References

Further reading

External links
Marion Wachtel web site

American women painters
American Impressionist painters
1870s births
1954 deaths
Painters from California
19th-century American painters
20th-century American painters
20th-century American women artists
19th-century American women artists